Rešetari is a village and municipality in Brod-Posavina County, Croatia. There are a total of 4,753 inhabitants, in the following settlements:
 Adžamovci, population 612
 Brđani, population 252
 Bukovica, population 152
 Drežnik, population 464
 Gunjavci, population 424
 Rešetari, population 2,450
 Zapolje, population 399

In the 2011 census, the absolute majority were Croats.

References

Municipalities of Croatia
Populated places in Brod-Posavina County